Kishoreganj Sadar is an upazila of Kishoreganj District in the Division of Dhaka, Bangladesh. It is best known as the home upazila of Syed Nazrul Islam, an Acting President of Bangladesh.

Geography
It has 55,828 housing units and a total area 193.73 km2. Kishoregonj is the name of a district where some important people were born.
Kishoreganj Sadar Upazila (kishoreganj district) is bounded by Nandail upazila on the north, Pakundia and Katiadi upazilas on the south, Karimganj and Tarail upazilas on the east and Hossainpur and Nandail upazilas on the west. The principal river is the Narsunda.

Demographics
As of the 1991 Bangladesh census, Kishoreganj Sadar had a population of 300,337. Males constituted 51.52% of the population, females 48.48%. This upazila's population of eighteen and older was 149,926. Kishoreganj Sadar had an average literacy rate of 28.3% (7+ years). The national average was 32.4% literate.

Administration
Kishoreganj Upazila is divided into Kishoreganj Municipality and 11 union parishads: Baulai, Binnati, Chauddasata, Danapatali, Jasodal, Korsha Kariail, Latibabad, Mahinanda, Maijkhapan, Maria, and Rashidabad. The union parishads are subdivided into 110 mauzas and 210 villages.

Kishoreganj Municipality is subdivided into 9 wards and 56 mahallas.

Education
According to Banglapedia, Kishoregonj Government Boys' High School, founded in 1881, is a notable secondary school.

Gurudayal Government College or Gurudayal College (Bengali: গুরুদয়াল সরকারি মহাবিদ্যালয়) is a public college under National University located in Kishoreganj Municipality, Kishoreganj Sadar Upazila. Established in 1943, the college has produced a president of Bangladesh. Abdul Hamid, 16th president of Bangladesh, was a student of this college.

See also
Egarosindur
Sholakia
Upazilas of Bangladesh
Districts of Bangladesh
Divisions of Bangladesh

References

Upazilas of Kishoreganj District